Bontemps is a surname of French origin, meaning "good time".

Individuals with the name "Bontemps" include:

Artists and writers
Arna Bontemps, novelist
the Bontemps African American Museum, named for him
Georges Bontemps, artistic glassmaker
Jongnic Bontemps, film and TV composer
Pierre Bontemps, 17th-century sculptor

Athletes
Doriane Bontemps, ice dancer
Jorge Bontemps, footballer
Julien Bontemps, Olympic sailor
Ron Bontemps, Olympic basketball player
Paul Bontemps, Olympic athlete

Fictional characters
Roger Bontemps, the personification of leisure time

Others
Alexandre Bontemps, 17th-century courtier
Blaise Bontems, 19th-century designer of automata
Jean Bontemps, privateer
Napoléon Joseph Louis Bontemps, colonial governor

See also
Bon Temps, Louisiana, the fictional setting of the True Blood series on HBO, and of Southern Vampire Mysteries series of novels on which it is based
the phrase Laissez les bons temps rouler, which literally translates to "let the good times roll"